My Roommate Is a Detective is a 2020 Chinese streaming television series starring Hu Yitian, Zhang Yunlong and Xiao Yan. It follows a deduction genius, a detective and a newspaper reporter who team up to solve mysterious cases. The series aired on iQiyi on March 24, 2020. The series received positive reviews.

Cast
Hu Yitian as Lu Yao
Zhang Yunlong as Qiao Chusheng
Xiao Yan as Bai Youning

References 

2020 Chinese television series debuts